Bharat Nagar is a neighbourhood in the northwestern part of the city of Hyderabad, India. Prior to being incorporated into the Greater Hyderabad Municipal Corporation (GHMC), it was part of the  Kukatpally municipality. At present it is located in Circle XIV of the GHMC, on Sanjeeva Reddy Nagar Main Road (NH-9) at the flyover, south of Moosapet.  It is in the eastern part of the Motinagar election ward. It is located by the Pune Hyderabad Machilipatnam highway NH 65.

Transport
Bharat Nagar is connected by buses run by TSRTC. Buses that run are 218D,113,10. There is a MMTS train station is at Bharat Nagar.

The buses from Secunderabad station to Bharath Nagar are 10K, 10K/L,10K/18.

Culture
Bharath Nagar is famous for Hari Hara Temple.

References

Neighbourhoods in Hyderabad, India